Haplodrassus is a genus of ground spiders that was first described by R. V. Chamberlin in 1922. H. signifer is the most widespread species, found across North America except for Alaska and northern Canada.

Species
 it contains seventy-nine species:
H. aenus Thaler, 1984 – Switzerland, Austria
H. alexeevi Ponomarev & Shmatko, 2017 – Russia (Europe)
H. ambalaensis Gajbe, 1992 – India
H. atarot Levy, 2004 – Israel
H. belgeri Ovtsharenko & Marusik, 1988 – Russia (South to north-east Siberia, Far East)
H. bengalensis Gajbe, 1992 – India
H. bicornis (Emerton, 1909) – USA, Canada
H. bohemicus Miller & Buchar, 1977 – Czech Rep., Macedonia, Greece, Ukraine?, Russia (Europe, Caucasus)?
H. canariensis Schmidt, 1977 – Canary Is.
H. caspius Ponomarev & Belosludtsev, 2008 – Russia (Europe, Caucasus), Azerbaijan, Iran, Kazakhstan
H. caucasius Ponomarev & Dvadnenko, 2013 – Caucasus (Russia, Georgia)
H. chamberlini Platnick & Shadab, 1975 – North America
H. chotanagpurensis Gajbe, 1987 – India
H. cognatus (Westring, 1861) – Europe, Russia (Europe to Far East), Caucasus, Kazakhstan, Japan
Haplodrassus c. ermolajewi Lohmander, 1942 – Russia (West Siberia)
H. concertor (Simon, 1878) – France
H. crassipes (Lucas, 1846) – Morocco, Algeria
H. creticus (Roewer, 1928) – Greece (Crete)
H. dalmatensis (L. Koch, 1866) – Europe, North Africa, Turkey, Middle East, Russia (Europe) to Central Asia
Haplodrassus d. pictus (Thorell, 1875) – Spain, Madeira
H. dentatus Xu & Song, 1987 – China
H. dentifer Bosmans & Abrous, 2018 – Morocco, Algeria, Tunisia, Spain
H. deserticola Schmidt & Krause, 1996 – Canary Is.
H. dixiensis Chamberlin & Woodbury, 1929 – USA
H. dumdumensis Tikader, 1982 – India
H. eunis Chamberlin, 1922 – USA, Canada
H. hatsushibai Kamura, 2007 – Japan
H. hiemalis (Emerton, 1909) (type) – North America, Russia (Europe to Far East)
H. huarong Yin & Bao, 2012 – China
H. hunanensis Yin & Bao, 2012 – China
H. ibericus Melic, Silva & Barrientos, 2016 – Portugal, Spain
H. invalidus (O. Pickard-Cambridge, 1872) – Egypt, Cyprus, Turkey, Israel, Azerbaijan, Greece?
H. ivlievi Ponomarev, 2015 – Russia (Europe)
H. jacobi Gajbe, 1992 – India
H. kanenoi Kamura, 1995 – Japan
H. kulczynskii Lohmander, 1942 – Europe, Turkey, Russia (Europe to Far East), China, Korea
H. lilliputanus Levy, 2004 – Israel
H. longivulva Bosmans & Hervé, 2018 – Morocco, Algeria
H. lyndae Abrous & Bosmans, 2018 – Morocco, Algeria, Spain
H. macellinus (Thorell, 1871) – France, Italy, Portugal?, Spain?
H. maculatus (Banks, 1904) – USA, Mexico
H. mayumiae Kamura, 2007 – Korea, Japan
H. mediterraneus Levy, 2004 – Turkey, Syria, Lebanon, Israel, Jordan
H. mimus Chamberlin, 1922 – USA
H. minor (O. Pickard-Cambridge, 1879) – Europe, Turkey
H. moderatus (Kulczyński, 1897) – Europe, Russia (Europe to Far East), China
H. montanus Paik & Sohn, 1984 – Russia (Far East), China, Korea
H. morosus (O. Pickard-Cambridge, 1872) – Greece, Turkey, Israel
H. nigroscriptus (Simon, 1909) – Morocco
H. nojimai Kamura, 2007 – Japan
H. omissus (O. Pickard-Cambridge, 1872) – Canary Is., Morocco, Mediterranean
H. orientalis (L. Koch, 1866) – Greece, Ukraine, Russia (Europe), Kazakhstan
H. ovatus Bosmans & Hervé, 2018 – Algeria, Tunisia
H. ovtchinnikovi Ponomarev, 2008 – Turkey, Iran, Kazakhstan
H. paramecus Zhang, Song & Zhu, 2001 – China
H. pargongsanensis Paik, 1992 – Korea
H. ponomarevi Kovblyuk & Seyyar, 2009 – Greece, Turkey
H. pseudosignifer Marusik, Hippa & Koponen, 1996 – Ukraine, Russia (Europe to Central Asia), Iran
H. pugnans (Simon, 1880) – Israel, Russia (Europe to Far East), China, Japan
H. reginae Schmidt & Krause, 1998 – Cape Verde Is.
H. rhodanicus (Simon, 1914) – Portugal, Spain, France, Italy (Sardinia), Tunisia
H. rufipes (Lucas, 1846) – Morocco, Algeria, Tunisia, Portugal, Spain, France, Italy
H. rufus (Savelyeva, 1972) – Kazakhstan
H. rugosus Tuneva, 2004 – Kazakhstan
H. sataraensis Tikader & Gajbe, 1977 – India
H. securifer Bosmans & Abrous, 2018 – Morocco, Algeria, Tunisia, Portugal, Spain, France, Italy, Belgium
H. signifer (C. L. Koch, 1839) – North America, Europe, North Africa, Turkey, Israel, Caucasus, Russia (Europe to Far East), Central Asia, China, Korea
H. silvestris (Blackwall, 1833) – Europe, Turkey, Caucasus
H. soerenseni (Strand, 1900) – Europe, Turkey, Caucasus, Russia (Europe to Far East), Kazakhstan, China
H. stuxbergi (L. Koch, 1879) – Russia (West to Middle Siberia)
H. taepaikensis Paik, 1992 – Russia (South Siberia, Far East), Korea
H. taibo (Chamberlin, 1919) – USA
H. tegulatus (Schenkel, 1963) – Russia (South Siberia), China
H. tehriensis Tikader & Gajbe, 1977 – India
H. triangularis Bosmans, 2018 – Morocco, Tunisia
H. typhon (Simon, 1878) – Algeria, Tunisia, Portugal, Spain, France, Italy (Sardinia)
H. umbratilis (L. Koch, 1866) – Europe to Kazakhstan
Haplodrassus u. gothicus Lohmander, 1942 – Sweden
H. vastus (Hu, 1989) – China

References

Araneomorphae genera
Gnaphosidae
Spiders of Africa
Spiders of Asia
Spiders of North America